Novokrasnoye is a rural locality (a selo) and the administrative center of Novokrasinsky Selsoviet of Volodarsky District, Astrakhan Oblast, Russia. The population was 295 as of 2010. There are 9 streets.

Geography 
Novokrasnoye is located 26 km east of Volodarsky (the district's administrative centre) by road. Novomayachnoye and Konny Mogoy are the nearest rural localities.

References 

Rural localities in Volodarsky District, Astrakhan Oblast